Hyalella montezuma is a pelagic amphipod. It lives in Montezuma Well, an oasis in central Arizona. It is the only food of the endemic leech Motobdella montezuma.

References

Gammaridea
Freshwater crustaceans of North America
Endemic fauna of Arizona
Crustaceans described in 1977